Johanna Louise Spyri (12 June 1827 – 7 July 1901) was a Swiss author of novels, notably children's stories. She wrote the popular book Heidi. Born in Hirzel, a rural area in the canton of Zurich, Switzerland, as a child she spent several summers near Chur in Graubünden, the setting she later would use in her novels.

Biography
In 1852, Johanna Heusser married Bernhard Spyri. Bernhard was a lawyer. Whilst living in the city of Zürich she began to write about life in the country. Her first story, A Leaf on Vrony's Grave, which deals with a woman's life of domestic violence, was published in 1880; the following year further stories for both adults and children appeared, among them the novel Heidi, which she wrote in four weeks. Heidi tells the story of an orphan girl who lives with her grandfather in the Swiss Alps, and is famous for its vivid portrayal of the landscape.

Her husband and her only child, both named Bernhard, both died in 1884. Alone, she devoted herself to charitable causes and wrote over fifty more stories before her death in 1901. She was interred in the family plot at the Sihlfeld-A Cemetery in Zürich. An icon in Switzerland, Spyri's portrait was placed on a postage stamp in 1951 and on a 20 CHF commemorative coin in 2009.

Plagiarism claim
In April 2010 a professor searching for children's illustrations found a book written in 1830 by a German history teacher, Hermann Adam von Kamp, that Spyri may have used as a basis for Heidi. The 1830 story is titled Adelheide - das Mädchen vom Alpengebirge—translated, "Adelaide, the girl from the Alps". The two stories were alleged to share many similarities in plot line and imagery. Spyri biographer Regine Schindler said it was entirely possible that Johanna may have been familiar with the story as she grew up in a literate household with many books. However, the professor's claims have been examined and afterwards described as "unscientific", due to 'superficial coincidences' he brings up in descriptions and the many actual differences in the story, that he doesn't, as well as the "Swiss disease" of homesickness already being a common trope in fiction in the eighteenth (nineteenth in the article) century (as well as, while not mentioned in the article, it being discovered before von Kamp was even born) and characters that are either drastically different or not in "Adelaide", at all.

Bibliography
The following is a list of her main books:

Heimatlos: Two stories for children, and for those who love children (1877)
Heidi (1880-81) 
The Story of Rico (1882) 
Uncle Titus and His Visit to the Country (1883)
Gritli's Children (1883-84)
Rico and Wiseli (1885)
Veronica And Other Friends (1886)
What Sami Sings with the Birds (1887)
Toni, the Little Woodcarver (1890)
Erick and Sally (1891)
Mäzli (1891) 
Cornelli (1892)
Vinzi: A Story of the Swiss Alps (1892)
Moni the Goat-Boy (1897)
Little Miss Grasshopper (1898)

Her books were originally written in German. The translations into English at the end of the 19th century, or the early 1900s, mention H. A. Melcon (1839–1910), Maria Louise Kirk (1860–1938), Emma Stelter Hopkins, Louise Brooks, Helen B. Dole and the couple Charles Wharton Stork and Elisabeth P. Stork.

References

External links
 
 
 
 
 
 Works by Johanna Spyri at Classicreader.com

1827 births
1901 deaths
People from Horgen District
Swiss children's writers
German-language writers
19th-century Swiss novelists
19th-century Swiss women writers
19th-century Swiss writers
Swiss women children's writers
Swiss women novelists